Llewella Gideon (born 27 September 1967 in Peckham, South London) is a British actress, comedian and writer. She has appeared in a number of comedy series, including Absolutely Fabulous, The Real McCoy, The Crouches, and The Delivery Man, and provided the UK voice of Molly and Trix in Bob the Builder. She wrote and starred in the radio series The Little Big Woman, which ran on BBC Radio 4 from 2001 to 2003. The show was awarded the Critics' Choice by both The Times and The Guardian.

Early life
Gideon was born on 27 September 1967 in Peckham, South London. As a child, she attended Lyndhurst Primary School in neighbouring Camberwell and Haberdashers' Aske's Hatcham College in New Cross. Even as a youngster, Gideon was drawn to acting and writing, and her mother encouraged her interests by enrolling her in Saturday classes at the Italia Conti Academy of Theatre Arts.

References

External links

English film actresses
English television actresses
English voice actresses
English radio writers
Living people
1967 births
Black British actresses